Thomas Lièvremont (born 6 November 1973) is a French rugby union footballer.

Thomas Lièvremont was born in Perpignan. He currently coaches Dax in the second division of French rugby, Pro D2, but has agreed to join Top 14 side Bayonne as forwards coach for the 2010–11 season. His usual position was at number-eight. He was a part of the Biarritz team that won the 2005–06 Top 14, and runners-up of the 2005-06 Heineken Cup. He has also played for the France national team. He made his international debut for France in 1996 against Wales, and was a part of their 1999 Rugby World Cup squad.

He is the brother of two other rugby players: Matthieu and Marc, who was appointed coach of the French team on 24 October 2007. Their sister was also a rugby player.

External links
 Thomas Lièvremont on rbs6nations.com
 Thomas Lièvremont on ercrugby.com
 99 RWC profile

1973 births
Living people
French people of Catalan descent
Sportspeople from Perpignan
French rugby union players
USA Perpignan players
France international rugby union players
Romania national rugby union team coaches
Rugby union number eights
Biarritz Olympique players
US Dax coaches
French expatriate sportspeople in Romania
US Dax players